Pam Borton (born August 22, 1965) is a former Final Four women's basketball coach, most recently at the University of Minnesota. She took over following the resignation of Brenda Frese in 2002.

As the head coach for the Gophers, she had a record of 236–152 and an overall career record as a head coach of 305–198. She is the winningest head coach in the program history at the University of Minnesota.  Previously, Borton was the head coach at the University of Vermont from 1993 to 1997 and was an assistant at Boston College from 1998 to 2002, where she served as associate head coach for her last two seasons.

Borton led Minnesota to its first Final Four appearance in 2004, an elite eight, three straight Sweet 16’s numerous NCAA appearances.

In 2014, she founded Pam Borton Partners, an executive coaching and consulting firm. She has an advanced degree in personal and executive coaching from the College of Executive Coaching in Santa Barbara, CA. She is an ICF Senior Executive Coach, leadership expert, facilitator, professional speaker and Author.

In 2011, she founded TeamWomen, a premiere professional women’s organization in the Twin Cities, focused on professional development, mentoring, leadership, networking and women supporting women.

In 2015, she also founded Empower. Empower is a leadership academy for girls in grades 5–12. The mission is to develop, inspire, and develop our next generation of leaders.

In 2014, influential community and campus leaders raised over $150,000 for an endowment in Pam Borton's name. This endowment is housed in the College of Education and Human Development at the University of Minnesota to promote leadership for women and girls in a sport context. It's the only endowment of its kind in the world.

Pam Borton authored a leadership book, ON Point: A Coaches Game Plan to Life, Leadership and Performance with Grace Under Fire.  She has a rare combination of real executive experience in the sports world building high performance  teams, and now an ICF Senior Executive Coach, professional speaker and facilitator. She is also certified in positive psychology and well-being, EQ-i 2.0 emotional intelligence, HRG resilience and a certified global team coach.  She is a National-Board Certified Health and Wellness coach, by the national board of medical examiners (NBME).

She is currently working on her second book developing the corporate athlete's resilience and mental toughness. Book release is expected in 2021.

Head coaching record

References

External links
 http://TeamwomenMN.org
 http://empowergirlsacademy.org
 http://pambortonpartners.com
 https://onpointnextlevel.com/
 University of Minnesota Biography

1965 births
Living people
American women's basketball coaches
Boston College Eagles women's basketball coaches
Bowling Green Falcons women's basketball coaches
College women's basketball players in the United States
Defiance College alumni
Minnesota Golden Gophers women's basketball coaches
Place of birth missing (living people)
Vermont Catamounts women's basketball coaches